Peter Aldridge (born 2 January 1961) is a Jamaican former cyclist. He competed at the 1980, 1984 and 1988 Summer Olympics.

References

External links
 

1961 births
Living people
Jamaican male cyclists
Olympic cyclists of Jamaica
Cyclists at the 1980 Summer Olympics
Cyclists at the 1984 Summer Olympics
Cyclists at the 1988 Summer Olympics
Place of birth missing (living people)
Cyclists at the 1983 Pan American Games
Pan American Games medalists in cycling
Pan American Games bronze medalists for Jamaica
Commonwealth Games competitors for Jamaica
Cyclists at the 1978 Commonwealth Games
Cyclists at the 1982 Commonwealth Games
Cyclists at the 1990 Commonwealth Games
Medalists at the 1983 Pan American Games